3rd Sculpture International was a 1949 exhibition of contemporary sculpture held inside and outside the Philadelphia Museum of Art, in Philadelphia, Pennsylvania, USA. It featured works by 250 sculptors from around the world, and ran from May 15 to September 11, 1949. The exhibition was organized by the Fairmount Park Art Association (now the Association for Public Art) under the terms of a bequest made to the Association by the late Ellen Phillips Samuel.

Ellen Phillips Samuel was a member of the Fairmount Park Art Association and a supporter of many cultural activities in Philadelphia. When she died in 1913, she left the bulk of her estate in trust to the Art Association, specifying that the income be used to create a series of sculptural monuments “emblematic of the history of America.” When these funds became available upon the death of her husband in 1929, the Art Association appointed a planning committee, which decided that the Samuel Memorial should express major ideas and spiritual forces as well as chronological developments in American history.

To identify sculptors, the committee organized three international exhibitions at the Philadelphia Museum of Art. These Sculpture Internationals, in 1933, 1940, and 1949, brought together the works of hundreds of sculptors from the United States and abroad. The exhibitions contributed not only to the Samuel Memorial but also to the general awareness of contemporary sculpture throughout the Philadelphia area.

Sculptors
Among the sculptors who exhibited were:
 
Humbert Albrizio 
Connor Barrett 
Richmond Barthé 
Gladys Edgerly Bates
Alexander Calder 
Cornellia Van A. Chapin
Robert Cronbach
Jo Davidson 
Jacob Epstein
Mitchell Fields 
Minna Harkavy
Vincent Glinsky
Chaim Gross
Nathaniel Kaz 
 Jacques Lipchitz 
Pablo Picasso
Bernard Reder
Marion Sanford
Concetta Scaravaglione
Mitzi Solomon
William Steig
 Marion Walton
 A.A. Weinman 
Robert Weinman 
William Zorach

The photograph
The June 20, 1949, issue of Life magazine featured the photograph 70 Sculptors by Herbert Gehr. It showed 70 of the sculptors seated on the staircase of the museum's Great Hall and surrounded by a number of their works. Gehr took the photograph on May 14, 1949, the day before the exhibition's opening. An intensive search has been underway since 2002 to identify all 70 sculptors in the photograph.

References

3rd Sculpture International checklist.
Bach, Penny Balkin, Public Art in Philadelphia, Temple University Press, Philadelphia, Pennsylvania, 1992
Fairmount Park Art Association 3rd Sculpture International, Press Report, 1949
Kvaran, Einar Einarsson, Who Are These People? unpublished research into the 70 sculptors photographed by LIFE Magazine
LIFE magazine, June 20, 1949

Sculpture exhibitions
American contemporary art
Sculpture
Contemporary art exhibitions
Art exhibitions in the United States
Philadelphia Museum of Art